Indonesia and Peru established diplomatic relations in 1975. Both nations see each other as an attractive market with good prospects and potentials, and seeks to boost trade relations. Indonesia has an embassy in Lima, while Peru has an embassy in Jakarta. Indonesia and Peru are members of multilateral organizations such as the Asia-Pacific Economic Cooperation, the World Trade Organization (WTO), Non-Aligned Movement and Forum of East Asia-Latin America Cooperation.

History

Established on August 12, 1975, the Indonesian mission to Peru at the time was accredited through the Indonesian embassy in Brasilia. The Peruvian government opened its embassy in Jakarta on November 1, 1992. Considering the ineffectiveness and the need to strengthen the cooperation with Peru, the Indonesian government opened the Indonesian embassy in Lima on February 20, 2002.

Trade and investment
Peruvian investors were seeking opportunities in Indonesia, such as the soft drink company, Big Cola, had entered the Indonesian market and doing very well, which inspires more Peruvian investors that may follow in the future. According to the data from the Indonesian Central Statistics Agency (BPS), trade between Peru and Indonesia reaching US$213.37 million in 2011. The trade balance heavily favors Indonesia, which mainly exports rubber, wood products, sports shoes, paper, garments, motorcycle spare parts, aluminum, glass, ceramics, plastic and electronics to Peru. On the other hand, Indonesia imports fish meal, animal feed, medicines, grapes, wheat and fertilizers from Peru. In October 2013, Indonesia and Peru signed a memorandum of understanding (MoU) on agriculture cooperation.

See also 
 Foreign relations of Indonesia
 Foreign relations of Peru
 List of ambassadors of Peru to Indonesia

References

External links
Embassy of Indonesia in Lima, Peru 
Embassy of Peru in Jakarta, Indonesia

Peru
Bilateral relations of Peru